The Devil Punisher is a 2020 Taiwanese time travel and supernatural series. It stars Mike He, Ivy Shao, Amanda Chou, Johnny Yang, Anson Chen, Jane Cheng and Roy Chang as the main cast. It is the second collaboration between Sanlih E-Television and Netflix, and is also the channel's flagship drama for the year. The drama is one of the 107 television shows that received 23 million New Taiwan dollars' worth of grants from the government. Filming commenced on 20 February 2020 and wrapped on 12 July 2020. It was first broadcast on 25 October 2020.

Plot
A baker by day and demon fighter by night, Zhong Kui, a reincarnated deity must jog his amnesiac lover's memory of their millennium-long romance.

Cast

Main cast
Mike He as Zhong Kui / Zhong Zheng-nan
Ivy Shao as Lady Meng / Meng Hsin-yu / Xiao-bing
Amanda Chou as Lady Qin Kuang
Johnny Yang as Cheng Huang
Anson Chen as Lu Bo-ya
Jane Cheng as Li En-hsi
Roy Chang as Ouyang Kai

Supporting cast
 as Bat Spirit / Ah-Fu
Dewi Chien as Seven Star Sword Spirit / Hsiao-chi
Tan Ai-chen as Grandma Wu
Yin Chao-te as Wu Ching-yuan
Peter Kuan as Chen Ze-hsuan
Sing Hom as Wei Yun-han
Hank Wang as Zhao Jia-jun

Guest appearances
Akio Chen as taoist ghost
Ed Chan as male ghost
Wu Ting-Chien as male ghost
Da Fei as policeman
Chang Han as Chen Zheng-ming
 as Li Shu-hui
Yu Yanchen as Ah-Ping
Hsieh Chi-Wen as Hong Cheng-you
King Liu as Cheng-you's boss
Chang Chien as En-hsi's mother
Pipi Yao as Gao Jia-chi
Lyan Cheng as Yao Mu-ching
Kelly Ko as Ze-hsuan's mother
Ally Chiu as Wu Yu-han
Chang Kuo-tung as Lord of the Soil and the Ground
Daniel Chen
Kurt Chou
Ivelyn Lee
Louis Lin
Kingone Wang

Soundtrack
"Last Look 喂，再看我一遍" by MIXER 
"After a Thousand Years 千年以後" by Nine Chen
"If You Turn Around 如果你敢回頭" by Amanda Wang and Anson Chen
"Just Memories 回不去的回憶" by Men Envy Children
"Guards of Princess Wendy 溫蒂公主的侍衛" by Accusefive
"Loveholic 嗜愛動物" by MIXER
"The Light-Year Passenger 穿越光年的孤獨" by Tizzy Bac
"As I am 我已成為我想要的我" by Shara Lin
"Blossom 桃花籤" by DeerJenny
"Shining Stars 星點" by DeerJenny

Broadcast

Ratings
Competing dramas on rival channels airing at the same time slot were:

 CTS – U Motherbaker, Mother to be
 FTV – Animal Whisper, See You at the Market, MIU404
 CTV – Chinese Restaurant, Someday or One Day (re-run)
 SET Taiwan – Top Singers

References

External links
 (SETTV)
 (TTV)

2020 Taiwanese television series debuts
2021 Taiwanese television series endings
Mandarin-language Netflix original programming
Romantic fantasy television series
Sanlih E-Television original programming
Supernatural television series
Taiwan Television original programming
Taiwanese drama television series
Taiwanese romance television series
Taoism in popular culture
Television series about ghosts
Television series based on Chinese mythology
Television shows about reincarnation